The cervical branch of the facial nerve is a nerve in the neck. It is a branch of the facial nerve (VII). It supplies the platysma muscle, among other functions.

Structure 
The cervical branch of the facial nerve is a branch of the facial nerve (VII). It runs forward beneath the platysma muscle, and forms a series of arches across the side of the neck over the suprahyoid region. One branch descends to join the cervical cutaneous nerve from the cervical plexus.

Function 
The lateral part of the cervical branch of the facial nerve supplies the platysma muscle.

Additional images

References

External links 
  - "Branches of Facial Nerve (CN VII)"
 
 
 https://web.archive.org/web/20080921093026/http://www.dartmouth.edu/~humananatomy/figures/chapter_47/47-5.HTM

Facial nerve